Best of Hilary Duff is the first greatest hits album by American recording artist Hilary Duff. It was released on November 11, 2008, by Hollywood Records. The 12-track album consists of eight of Duff's previous singles, as well as two new recordings: "Reach Out" and "Holiday". It also includes three new remixes: two of the former, and one of "Come Clean".

One single was released from the album, the Ryan Tedder-produced "Reach Out", which became her third consecutive single to chart at number one on the Billboard Hot Dance Club Play.

Background
Duff confirmed that she had collaborated with a rapper called Prophet on a previously unheard song on the Dignity tour's set list, "Reach Out" in September 2007. In an interview with remix producer Joe Bermudez in November 2007, she said that Dignity would be re-released in a CDVU+ edition featuring remixes of the original songs alongside two new tracks: "Reach Out" and "Holiday". Duff said she hoped to write a third new song for the re-release, and to have "Holiday" released as its first or second single. However, Hollywood Records scrapped the plans, adding to their large list of cancelations, which in turn led Duff to make the decision to leave the label. Duff was disappointed with the release, saying in an interview on the Johnjay and Rich Show: "my label had an option to put this record out, and they did it, and I was a little bummed." The album artwork, photographed by Leslie Kee, was previously used for the Japanese release of Dignity.

Unlike Duff's first compilation album Most Wanted (2005), which was advertised as strictly a compilation, Best of was strictly advertised as a greatest hits, making it her first.

Critical reception

Best of Hilary Duff received mostly mixed reviews from critics. Allmusic gave the album a positive review stating that Best of Hilary Duff "is a flipside of her 2005's Most Wanted", which was "pitched squarely at bright, happy tweens". They also went on to say the album "is not a look back at the past but a blueprint for the future". Allmusic gave the album a 3.5/5 star rating.
Commonsensemedia said that "Hilary Duff isn't for tweens anymore. The hit single "Reach Out" features more aggressive sexual lyrics than on previous albums. While Dignity was OK for 11-year-olds, the Best Of compilation pushes the target age higher. The funky remixes and danceable electronic beats are fun and catchy, but the sexed-up lyrics and themes aren't intended for younger fans." Rachel Devitt of Rhapsody said the collection "is largely pleasant, nicely polished and, rather surprisingly, sleek and even a little edgy. Turns out Lizzie McGuire is a dancefloor diva, and even with that feathery little voice, she manages to work it on tracks like the dark "Stranger," saucy new tune "Reach Out" and a clubby remix of "Dignity."

Commercial performance
On November 29, 2008, Best of Hilary Duff debuted at number 125 on the US Billboard 200 chart, selling 5,500 copies in its first week of release in the US, making it her least successful album to date. This is her first album not to receive any RIAA certifications. As of September 2012, the album has sold over 35,000 copies in the United States alone.

Singles
"Reach Out" was released as the only single from the album. The music video was directed by Philip Andelman and five official versions were released. The music video premiered on Duff's official MySpace on October 28, 2008.

Track listings

Notes
  signifies a remixer.
  signifies an original producer and remixer.

Personnel
Credits adapted from the liner notes of the Japanese edition of the album

 Hilary Duff                  – vocals & executive production 
 Prophet           – vocals 
 Haylie Duff                  – vocals 
 Ryan Tedder                  – production & engineering 
 Derrick Haruin                   – production 
 Vada Nobles                  – production & mixing 
 Logic                            – production & mixing 
 Rhett Lawrence               – production, mixing & engineering 
 Dead Executives  – production & mixing ; bass guitar 
 John Shanks                  – production ; mixing 
 The Matrix – production, mixing, arrangement & recording 
 Matthew Gerrard                  – production 
 Chico Bennett                – production ; remixing ; additional production 
 Charlie Midnight             – production 
 Denny Weston Jr.             – production 
 Desmond Child                – production 
 Andreas Carlsson             – production 
 Andre Recke                      – production ; executive production 
 Spider                           – production 
 Phil Tan                         – mixing 
 Jason Graucott                   – mixing 
 Dave Pensado                     – mixing & engineering 
 Steve McMillan                   – mixing & engineering 
 Jeff Rothschild                  – mixing 
 Rob Chiarelli                    – mixing 
 Joel Soyffer                     – mixing 
 Dave Way                         – mixing 
 Richard Vission              – remixing 
 Caramel Pod E                    – remixing 
 Joe Bermudez                     – remixing & additional production 
 Dirty Freqs                      – additional production 
 Brian Reeves                     – additional recording & mixing 
 Jay Landers                      – executive production 
 Jon Lind                         – executive production 
 Dean Butterworth                 – drums 
 Monique Powell                   – background vocals 
 The Fruit                        – background vocals 
 Allan Hessler                    – engineering assistance 
 Robert Vosgien                   – mastering 
 Leslie Kee                       – photography & creative direction
 Enny Joo                         – art direction & design

Charts

Release history

References

2008 greatest hits albums
Albums produced by Chico Bennett
Albums produced by John Shanks
Albums produced by Matthew Gerrard
Albums produced by Ryan Tedder
Albums produced by the Matrix (production team)
Hilary Duff compilation albums
Hollywood Records compilation albums